Wayoh Reservoir is a water reservoir in the town of Edgworth, Lancashire, England. It was completed on 28 April 1876 to supply water to Bolton. Wayoh, together with the Turton and Entwistle Reservoir, make up 50% of Bolton's drinking water.

Today the treatment plant can supply almost  of drinking water per day.

The reservoir is crossed by the earlier built Armsgrove Viaduct; which was built between 1847 and 1848 by the Blackburn, Darwen and Bolton Railway to bridge Bradshaw Brook.

References 

Drinking water reservoirs in England
Buildings and structures in Blackburn with Darwen
Reservoirs in Lancashire